Kiryugawa Dam is a gravity dam located in Gunma Prefecture in Japan. The dam is used for flood control, water supply and power production. The catchment area of the dam is 42 km2. The dam impounds about 62  ha of land when full and can store 12200 thousand cubic meters of water. The construction of the dam was started on 1972 and completed in 1982.

References

Dams in Gunma Prefecture